The  Punjab Bar Council  is a deliberative assembly of lawyers in Punjab. It is established by Parliament of Pakistan and consists of 75 members elected from different constituencies of Punjab. Its main functions are to promote and suggest law reforms, to safeguard the rights, interests and privileges of practicing lawyers while regulating their conduct, to recognize or derecognize Bar associations and to help in the administration of justice. Punjab Bar Council also sends one of its Member to Judicial Commission of Pakistan, who gives advice and vote for the appointment of Lahore High Court Judges. The council is the largest Provincial Bar Council in Pakistan with more than 100,000 advocates as its License holders. All Bar associations of Punjab including Tehsil Bar Associations, District Bar Associations and High Court Bar Associations work under the Jurisdiction of Punjab Bar Council. Currently more than 124 Bar associations are working under Punjab Bar Council. The lawyers recognized by the council can only represent clients in the all Branches of Lahore High Court, District Courts and Session Courts in Punjab, Pakistan. The Punjab Bar Council is based in Lahore, Pakistan, came into being as a result of the promulgation of the Legal Practitioners and Bar Councils Act, 1973 (Act XXXV of 1973). The Council commenced functioning with effect from 1 January 1974.

Composition

The Punjab Bar Council consists of 75 Members of Punjab Bar Council elected by the advocates from different constituencies across the Punjab Province, These Members serve a term of five years and further elect Chairman Executive Committee and  Vice-chairman  of Council each Year.
The Advocate General of the Punjab, acts as ex officio Chairman but being non-elected does not exercise the power as do the elected positions in the council. Power of Advocate General of Punjab is only limited to his role as returning officer of elections and in publishing the gazette.

The composition of the bar council for 2021–2025 term has been retained by the Independent Lawyers Group.

Chairman Executive, Punjab Bar Council
The Chairman Executive Committee is practically the most powerful office of Bar Council and is elected by the members of the Council in each year. Chairman Executive Committee has full authority to decide matters of Bar Council in every aspect. under the Punjab Legal Practitioners and Bar Councils Rules, 1974, the Chairman of Executive Committee exercise the powers (a) to implement the decisions of Bar Council (b) to advise the Bar Council in all matters relating to its functions (c) to supervise and deal with the all matters regarding administration of the Bar Council (d) to constitute sub-committee and to entrust such of its functions thereto as may be necessary (e) to institute and defend other proceedings on the behalf of Bar Council (f) to perform such functions as the Bar Council may entrust to it.

Vice Chairman, Punjab Bar Council
Vice Chairman is figurehead of Bar Council and Elected by the members of the Council in January each year. VC plays the role of speaker and is traditionally considered as holding the foremost elected position in the bar council. Under the Punjab Legal Practitioners and Bar Councils Rules 1974, Vice Chairman is ex officio Member of each Committee of Bar Council. Executive powers of the council are however rest with the Executive Committee.

Secretary, Punjab Bar Council
secretary is an officer of Grade 21. He is non-elected and full-time semi-government employee, responsible to perform duties enshrined under the Legal Practitioners and Bar Councils Act, 1973, and the Punjab Legal Practitioners & Bar Council Rules, 1974 and to deal with the administrative affairs. secretary works under the supervisory control of the Executive Committee of Punjab Bar Council.

List of Elected Leaders

Member Judicial Commission of Pakistan
 Punjab Bar Council (through majority decision) sends one of its Member to the Judicial Commission of Pakistan for a period of 2 years, He gives his opinion and vote for the appointments of Lahore High Court Judges and for the appointment of the Chief Justice of High Court.

See also 
 List of Law Schools approved by Punjab Bar Council

References

External links
 

 
Bar Councils in Pakistan
Pakistani lawyers
Organisations based in Punjab, Pakistan
1974 establishments in Pakistan
Organizations established in 1974